The 1984 Georgia Tech Yellow Jackets football team represented the Georgia Institute of Technology during the 1984 NCAA Division I-A football season. The Yellow Jackets were led by fifth-year head coach Bill Curry, and played their home games at Grant Field in Atlanta. In their second year as members of the Atlantic Coast Conference, the team finished in fifth with a final record of 6–4–1 (2–2–1 ACC).

Schedule

A.Clemson was under NCAA probation, and was ineligible for the ACC title. Therefore this game did not count in the league standings.

References

Georgia Tech
Georgia Tech Yellow Jackets football seasons
Georgia Tech Yellow Jackets football